Under Ten Flags is a 1960 Italian-American war film directed by Duilio Coletti and starring Van Heflin, Charles Laughton, and Mylène Demongeot. It was entered into the 10th Berlin International Film Festival.

Plot
Loosely based on actual events during World War II, the film depicts real-life German Captain Bernhard Rogge commanding the navy raider Atlantis, which from May 1940 to November 1941 sank 22 Allied merchant ships.  The story alternates between scenes at the Admiralty and scenes at sea, particularly showing Captain Rogge's humanity and chivalrous conduct of his military engagements.  Rogge was one of the few German flag rank officers who was not arrested by the Allies after the war, due to his conduct as a military officer.  After eighteen months of successful raids, Atlantis is sunk on 22 November 1941 by the British cruiser Devonshire.

Cast
 Van Heflin as Captain Bernhard Rogge
 Charles Laughton as Admiral Russell
 Mylène Demongeot as Zizi
 John Ericson as Krüger
 Cecil Parker as Col. Howard
 Folco Lulli as Paco
 Alex Nicol as Knoche
 Liam Redmond as Windsor
 Eleonora Rossi Drago as Elsa
 John Lee
 Ralph Truman as Adm. Benson
 Grégoire Aslan as Master of Abdullah
 Peter Carsten as Lt. Mohr
 Helmut Schmid
 Gian Maria Volonté as Samuel Braunstein (as Gianmaria Volonté)

References

External links

1960 films
American black-and-white films
American war films
English-language Italian films
Films directed by Duilio Coletti
Films produced by Dino De Laurentiis
Macaroni Combat films
World War II naval films
Films scored by Nino Rota
1960s English-language films
1960s American films
1960s Italian films